Église Sainte-Marie-Majeure de Bonifacio is a Roman Catholic church in Bonifacio, Corse-du-Sud, southeastern Corsica. 
The building was classified as a Historic Monument in 1982. It was built in the 12-13th century.

References

Buildings and structures completed in the 13th century
Churches in Corsica
Monuments historiques of Corsica